Richard Dalby Morkill was the mayor of Sherbrooke, Quebec, Canada, from 27 January 1873 to 20 January 1875.

References

Year of birth missing
Year of death missing
Mayors of Sherbrooke